"Regrets" is a song by Barbara Wyrick. Originally written for Marie Osmond, it was instead recorded by James Brown. Released as a single in 1980, it reached #63 on the R&B chart. It also appeared on the album People. Writing in The Village Voice, Thulani Davis described it as "sentimental, nice enough but not at all compelling."

References

James Brown songs
Songs written by Barbara Wyrick
1980 singles
1980 songs
Polydor Records singles